The Synagogue in Oni is a synagogue at 53 Vakhtang VI Street in Oni in the Republic of Georgia. The synagogue is located in the Racha region of Georgia. The Oni synagogue was built in 1895 and is the oldest functioning synagogue in Georgia.

History

Construction 
The synagogue was built in 1895 in an eclectic style. It is Georgia's third largest synagogue after the Great Synagoge of Tbilisi and the synagogue of Kutaisi.

1991 Racha earthquake 
During the 1991 Racha earthquake, the synagogue was severely damaged. Four years later, the synagogue was renovated with support from the government and the American Jewish Joint Distribution Committee. The president of Georgia at the time, Eduard Shevardnadze, attended the re-dedication ceremony.

120th anniversary 
On September 2, 2015, the synagogue held a ceremony for its 120th anniversary. Irakli Garibashvili, the prime minister of Georgia at the time, attended the ceremony.

Decline 
The country of Georgia used to have 250,000 Jews, who belonged to an ancient community that dated back thousands of years. They had endemic customs including special prayer styles. In the 1970s and 1990s, the majority of the Jewish population moved abroad (primarily to Israel), and only a few thousand in Georgia.

In 1972, the synagogue had 3,150 congregants but as of 2015 this number had fallen to only 16.

References

Synagogues in Georgia (country)
Orthodox synagogues
Buildings and structures in Racha-Lechkhumi and Kvemo Svaneti
Synagogues completed in 1895